Lupinus concinnus is a species of lupine known by the common name Bajada lupine. It is native to the southwestern United States from California to Texas, and northern Mexico, where it is known from many types of habitat. This is a hairy erect or decumbent annual herb with a stem growing 10 to 30 centimeters long. Each small palmate leaf is made up of 5 to 9 leaflets up to 3 centimeters long and under a centimeter wide, sometimes narrow and linear in shape. The inflorescence is a dense spiral of flowers, with some flowers also appearing in leaf axils lower on the plant. Each flower is 5 to 12 millimeters long and purple, pink, or nearly white in color. The fruit is a hairy legume pod around a centimeter long.

External links
Jepson Manual Treatment of Lupinus concinnus
Lupinus concinnus — UC Photos gallery

concinnus
Flora of the Southwestern United States
Flora of California
Flora of New Mexico
Flora of Northeastern Mexico
Flora of Northwestern Mexico
Flora of Texas
Flora of the Sonoran Deserts
Flora of the California desert regions
Natural history of the California chaparral and woodlands
Natural history of the California Coast Ranges
Natural history of the Colorado Desert
Natural history of the Mojave Desert
Natural history of the Peninsular Ranges
Natural history of the San Francisco Bay Area
Natural history of the Santa Monica Mountains
Natural history of the Transverse Ranges
Flora without expected TNC conservation status